Ville Vänni (born January 14, 1979) is a Finnish musician. He was one of the guitarists of the melodic death metal band Insomnium.

On October 31, 2011, Insomnium announced that Ville was leaving the band due to personal and career commitments. His final performance with the band was in Helsinki, Finland, after which his position was filled by Markus Vanhala, lead guitarist from Omnium Gatherum.

Equipment 
Ville's Equipment is listed on his personal page on the Insomnium website
 Gibson Les Paul Studio –89
 Ibanez RG 7-string
 Framus Cobra head & 4x12” cabinets
 TC-Electronics G-Major
 Ibanez Vintage Tube Screamer
 Dunlop Cry Baby wah
 Jazz III pics

External links 
The Insomnium Home Page: http://www.insomnium.net/home

References 

1979 births
Living people
Finnish guitarists
Finnish male guitarists
Finnish heavy metal musicians
21st-century guitarists
21st-century male musicians
Insomnium members